was the lead ship of the ten s built for the Imperial Japanese Navy in the mid-1930s under the Circle Two Program (Maru Ni Keikaku).

History
The Asashio-class destroyers were larger and more capable that the preceding , as Japanese naval architects were no longer constrained by the provisions of the London Naval Treaty. These light cruiser-sized vessels were designed to take advantage of Japan's lead in torpedo technology, and to accompany the Japanese main striking force and in both day and night attacks against the United States Navy as it advanced across the Pacific Ocean, according to Japanese naval strategic projections. Despite being one of the most powerful classes of destroyers in the world at the time of their completion, none survived the Pacific War.

Asashio, built at the Sasebo Naval Arsenal was laid down on 7 September 1935, launched on 16 December 1936 and commissioned on 31 August 1937. 
During trials, Asashio experienced steering problems and her maneuverability was unacceptable. The class was retrofitted with a redesigned stern and rudder design to resolve the problem. Other problems, chiefly involving the new and sophisticated  turbines, were also resolved.

Operational history
At the time of the attack on Pearl Harbor, Asashio served as the flagship of Destroyer Division 8 (Desdiv 8), and a member of Destroyer Squadron 2 (Desron 2), escorting Admiral Nobutake Kondō's Southern Force Main Body out of Mako Guard District as distant cover to the Malaya and Philippines invasion forces in December 1941. 
Asashio escorted a Malaya troop convoy from Mako towards Singora, then put into Hong Kong on 5 January 1942. She escorted another troop convoy to Davao, and then accompanied the Ambon invasion force (31 January), the Makassar invasion force (8 February) and the Bali/Lombok invasion force (18 February).

Battle of Badung Strait
On the night of 19 February 1942, Asashio participated in the Battle of Badoeng Strait. Asashio was guarding the transport Sasago Maru off Bali when an Allied fleet attacked. Asashio has been credited with sinking the Dutch destroyer  with a torpedo, plus gunnery hits on the Dutch light cruiser  and the American destroyer . Asashio suffered light damage: she was hit once with a  shell from Tromp, losing a searchlight and four men killed, 11 wounded. She towed her damaged sister ship  to Makassar after the battle.

In March, Desdiv 8 returned to Yokosuka. In April, Desdiv 8 was reassigned to Destroyer Squadron 4 (Desron 4). Desron 4 sailed to Manila Bay to assist in the shelling of Corregidor in late April and May 1942, returning to Kure, before deploying to Guam.

Battle of Midway
At the Battle of Midway on 4–6 June 1942, Asashio and Desron 4 escorted Admiral Takeo Kurita's Support Group covering the Midway troop convoy. She suffered medium damage in air attacks on 6 June, when she was hit by one  bomb, which killed 22 crewmen. She assisted her sister ship  in rescuing 240 survivors from the heavy cruiser , then escorted the crippled cruiser  to Truk on 14 June. After emergency repairs by the repair ship , Asashio sailed to Sasebo for more extensive repairs on 29 June. She was then reassigned to Desdiv 8 and was based at Yokosuka Naval District.

Naval battles of Guadalcanal
After a successful supply run to Jaluit and troop transport runs to Guadalcanal in September and October, Asashio  was part of the escort for Admiral Gunichi Mikawa's Support Force during several naval battles near Guadalcanal in November, but did not see combat. On 14 November, Asashio assisted the damaged light cruiser . Desdiv 8 then made three "Tokyo Express" troop transport runs from Rabaul to Buna in late November and early December 1942. After the first, Asashio towed the damaged destroyer  back to Rabaul on 21 November. The third run was aborted due to Allied air attack on 8 December; Asashio was temporarily disabled by near-misses by bombs off of her stern. The division then made a successful troop transport run to Finschhafen on 18 December.

On 7 February, Desdiv 8 repeated the escort mission to Kure with the carrier . The division then escorted another convoy from Truk to Rabaul, and a troop transport run from Rabaul to Madang and back. Desdiv 8 was assigned to Destroyer Squadron 3 of the IJN 8th Fleet on 25 February.

Battle of the Bismarck Sea
On 3 March 1943, Asashio and Desron 3 escorted a troop convoy from Rabaul towards Lae. In the Battle of the Bismarck Sea, the convoy was hit by an Allied air attack. After weathering the first waves, Asashio was bombed and strafed later in the day while attempting to rescue survivors from destroyer  and troopship . Among the casualties was Commander Destroyer Division 8, Captain Yasuo Sato. Few survivors escaped in a lifeboat that also rescued Nojima Maru's captain.

Asashio was removed from the navy list on 1 April 1943.

Notes

References

External links
 CombinedFleet.com: Asashio-class destroyers
 CombinedFleet.com: Asashio history
GlobalSecurity.org: Asashio class destroyers
GlobalSecurity.org: Asashio class ship list
GlobalSecurity.org: Asashio class schematics
GlobalSecurity.org: Asashio class specifications

Asashio-class destroyers
Ships built by Sasebo Naval Arsenal
World War II destroyers of Japan
Destroyers sunk by aircraft
Shipwrecks in the Solomon Sea
1936 ships
Maritime incidents in March 1943
World War II shipwrecks in the Pacific Ocean
Ships sunk by US aircraft
Shipwrecks in the Bismarck Sea